Maharaja Kam Dev Singh or Rao Dalpat Singh (b.1438-1532) was a Sikarwar Rajput  the ruler of the Pahargarh Estate, which mainly consisted of four cities in modern India, namely: Morena, Gwalior, Jhansi, Shivpuri. Kam Dev was the son of Maharaja Jay Raj Dev Singh who was the ruler of the Vijaypur Sikri estate (Fatehpur Sikri), which was spread over 35000 km2.

Kam Dev and Dham Dev ruled over large area which know consists of present day: Morena, Gwalior, Jhansi, Tikamgarh, Sagar, Chhatarpur, Satna, Rewa, Chitrakoot, Fatehpur, Kanpur (city)& Kanpur (dehat), Unnao, Auriya, Jalaun, Karauli, Dholpur, Banda, Mahoba, Shivpuri, Gauna, Sheopur, Fatehpur Sikri, Kheragarh, Bhind, Kannauj and Etawah, (or a area of almost 124765 km²) under the surgenaty of Ibrahim Lodi.

Early life
Kam Dev was born in the year 1438 at Vijaypur Sikri in a Sikarwar Rajput.  His father was Maharaja Jay Raj Dev Singh who was  ruler of Vijaypur Sikri estate in Rajput. Kam Dev had two younger brothers: Dharam Singh Dev Urf Rao Dham Dev and Vir Dev Singh Urf Vikram Pratap Dev Singh. Kam Dev's father gave him parts of the Pahadgarh estate. His coronation was in the year 1485 CE. Kam Dev also served as the army chief of his father's army. After the death of his father Raja Jai Raj Dev Singh (1420-1504) in 1504 CE, his brother Maharaja Dham Dev Singh (1453-1540) was crowned as the king of Vijaypur Sikri. Later, he shifted his capital from Vijaypur Sikri to a place known as Fatehabad near Fatehpur Sikri, now in Agra. Vijaypur Sikri was a large kingdom consisting of three cities, namely: Fatehpur Sikri (parts of Agra), Karauli, and Dholpur. Dham Dev was the ruler of Vijaypur and Kam Dev was the ruler of Pahadgarh. The youngest brother Vikram Partap Dev Singh was the one handling the affairs of both brothers' empires. After the death of Kam Dev's father, he became the army chief of Dham Dev's army. After the Battle of Khanwa, Kam Dev Lost his Kingdom but still, he had Kanpur, Kannauj, and Fatehpur under his control. Kam with His brother Dham established their Capital at Madarpur. They later go defeated in The Battle of Madarpur, and after the Battle of Ghaghra they finally moved to Ghazipur. In Ghazipur they bought some land near Birpur. Birpur was before ruled by Dikhit Rajputs. They fought the Battle in 1530 and overthrew the ruler of Birpur and became the ruler of the Birpur estate. Birpur estate was spread over a large area consisting present day the parganas and town name as Reotipur, Birpur, Gahmar, Nuaon, Kamsaar, Zamania, Ramgarh, Kaimur, Kochas, Chausa, Nasrabad, etc. The Birpur estate was spread over almost 2200 km2.

Battle of Khanwa 

During the Battle of Khanwa, Dham Dev, Kam Dev, and Vikram Dev joined the confederation  with 11,000 troops with administrative support to the confederation of Rana Sanga. A 1.8 lakh Rajput army stayed in the Bahadur Garh fort. Enough rations were collected and stocked inside the fort because Rana Sanga planned to capture Agra.

Earlier Rana Sanga was fully confident that he would win because he had the full support of the whole Rajput confederation . This couldn't happen since the Mughals were able to quickly capture Agra, and the Rajput lost. 

Rana Sanga was defeated. Dham Dev became the leader, which he conducted with a fair amount of discipline and control. The Bahadurgarh fort was blown with fire by the Mughal army. Babur also changed the name of Vijaypur Sikri to Fatehpur Sikri - both names have the same meaning, "the city of victory", Babur only changed the name to Persian.

The defeat in the battle of Khanwa was a major setback in the history of the Rajputs .

Babur, while describing the Battle of Khanwa in Baburnama, had mentioned Dham Dev and Kam Dev at least twice, along with Rana sanga, Medini Rai, and Maldev Rathore.

Migration 

After the defeat in the battle of Khanwa, many rulers left their towns and cities. Half of Kam Dev's family lived at Pahargarh and others left. Kam Dev had four sons. His first son's family moved to Kanpur district with Kam Dev; his second son's half family lived at Pahargarh and half went to Kanpur; the rest two sons half family also went to Kanpur district with him in year 1527 AD. Dham Dev went to Kanpur district with his family and younger brother, Vikram Pratap Dev. current descendent leave in sikri , Partap Ghar , Bihar , morena , or 12 village

Battle of Madarpur 
All three brothers shifted to Kanpur district with large amounts of gold coins and the statue of Sikarwar deity , Mata Kamakhya. In Kanpur, Babur attacked their kingdom and their fort in Madarpur. They fought the Battle of Madarpur against Babur's general Mir Baqi. Their army was small and they were defeated in 1528 AD.

Migration to Ghazipur

Kam Dev with Dham Dev came to Ghazipur on 26 Oct 1530 AD and settled at a place now known as Reotipur and named it Dalpatpur. Kam Dev's first son's family established 50 villages in Ghazipur district; his second son's family moved to Assam and established 29 villages in Morena district of Madhya Pradesh. His third son's family established 11 villages in Morena district of Madhya Pradesh and 56 villages in Kochas tehsil. The fourth son's family established 22 villages in Morena district, 60 villages in Kaimur district, in Rajgarh pargans and 60 villages near Chausa. Dham Dev's family established 84 villages near Gahmar and Bhabua, Kudra, Chainpur. Later on Kam Dev's great-grandson Nahrar Khan(formerly Nahrar Dev Rao) converted to Islam under the influence of a Sufi saint and his descendants became the Rajas and Nawabs of the Kamsar Raj and are known as the Kamsar Pathans. The conversion to Islam also bettered their relationship with the Moghuls and Sher Shah Suri.

See also
Battle of Madarpur
Battle of Khanwa
Battle of Chausa

References

1440 births
1530s deaths